Citrus latipes, commonly called "Khasi papeda", is sometimes mistakenly identified as Kaffir lime (C. hystrix).  Native to Northeast India, the khasi papeda is a small, thorny tree that closely resembles both kaffir limes and ichang papedas (C. cavaleriei). Though rarely eaten, and extremely rare in cultivation, the fruit is edible.

Medicinal uses 
Fruits of C. latipes are used medicinally in Northeastern India "to treat stone problem" and are known locally as Heiribob.

References 

latipes
Medicinal plants of Asia